Dame Kathleen Annie Raven, DBE, FRCN (9 November 1910, Coniston, Lancashire, England – 19 April 1999, Oxford, England) was a British nurse, matron, government health official, health care engineer, and educational philanthropist.

Career
 Matron, General Infirmary, Leeds (1949–57)
 Deputy Chief Nursing Officer, Ministry of Health (1957–58)
 Chief Nursing Officer, Department of Health and Social Security (1958–72)

Background
Kathleen Annie Raven was born and raised in Coniston in England's Lake District, attending Ulverston Grammar School.  Art was a strong influence on her as a child; one of her grandmother's friends was the painter John Ruskin. She was brought up in a Plymouth Brethren household where her parents read a chapter of the Bible every night. She had three brothers with whom she climbed mountains, skated, fished and rowed. Her elder brother, Ronald Raven, became a surgeon. Visiting her brother when he was a medical student at St Bartholomew's Hospital in London, she decided to become a nurse and started her training there in 1933.

Career
She trained as a nurse at St Bartholomew's Hospital in London (where her brother Ronald also trained as a doctor), qualifying in 1936. During World War II she was Ward Sister and Night Superintendent in that hospital. In 1946 she was appointed Assistant Matron there. In 1949, she was named as Deputy Matron at the General Infirmary in Leeds. She became Matron in the same year, and held the post for eight years. The General Infirmary at Leeds was the first teaching hospital to set up an Assistant Nurse Training Programme in 1955.

While at Leeds she was a member of both the General Nursing Council and the Council of the Royal College of Nursing, as Chair of the Yorkshire Branch of the RCN. Raven was also a member of the National Executive Committee of the Association of Hospital Matrons and served as a member of the Leeds Central Area Advisory Board for Secondary Education. For several years she was External Examiner for the Diploma in Nursing at the University of Leeds. In 1957 she became a member of the Central Health Services Council. Raven left Leeds to go to the Department of Health in London, where she became Chief Nursing Officer in July 1958, succeeding Dame Elizabeth Cockayne.

Later years
After her retirement from the Department of Health in 1972, and the death of her husband very shortly afterwards, Kathleen Raven undertook a heavy burden of work as adviser to a major international health care corporation, travelling extensively in the Middle East and Far East, establishing health care facilities along British lines. She worked for the Civil Service Commission and was appointed a Governor of Epsom College and of Aylesbury Grammar School. She died at the age of 88 in 1999.

Personal life
In 1959 she married Professor John Thornton Ingram; he died in 1972.

Endowments
 Kathleen A Raven Lecture at the Royal College of Nursing to provide a platform for distinguished speakers to promulgate their views on current nursing problems.
 Dame Kathleen Raven Chair in Clinical Nursing was endowed by Raven in 1998, the year before her death. 
The first holder of the chair was Professor Claire Hale. The most recent holder is Professor Steven Ersser, 2014–2017.

Honours
Her honours include Dame Commander of the Order of the British Empire, Fellow of the Royal College of Nursing (of which she was once Vice-President), Officer of the Order of St John, and Honorary degrees from Keele University and the University of Leeds. She was made a Patron of the Royal College of Surgeons of England and was an Honorary Freeman of the Worshipful Company of Barbers.

References

External links
Dame Kathleen Raven blog Royal College of Physicians museum
Oxford Database Index
 Archival material at 

1910 births
1999 deaths
English nurses
NHS Chief Professional Officers
British nursing administrators
Dames Commander of the Order of the British Empire
People from Coniston, Cumbria
People educated at Ulverston Grammar School
Fellows of the Royal College of Nursing
British nurses